Our Lady of the Rosary Cathedral, Waitara is the cathedral church of the Roman Catholic Diocese of Broken Bay and the seat and residence of the Catholic Bishop of Broken Bay, currently the Most Reverend Anthony Randazzo.

History
A church had existed in the vicinity of the current church since 1909, when a church was built on the side of the Pacific Highway. The parish of Waitara was established in 1916. Over time, demand for Catholic schools in the area led the Christian Brothers to establish St Leo's College Wahroonga for boys on a  site next to the church. Through the 1980s, the parishioners of the diocese were looking to build a new church and primary school. In 1988, Diocese of Broken Bay Bishop Patrick Murphy set about building more adequate diocesan offices and a bishop's office for the fledging diocese, which had only been established two years prior. The bishop chose a large area on Yardley Avenue, Waitara formed by the purchase of two vacant blocks of land adjoining St Leo's Catholic College. Work began on the offices in early 1998 and they were completed by the end of the year.
The same year, the parishioners of Waitara, along with parish priest Father Colin Blayney, decided to relocate and rebuild the church, selling the old church and land to Leighton Properties for $5 million.  A new parish centre of church, school, hall and presbytery was built and opened in 1991 and 1992.

Cathedral
Since its establishment in 1986, the Diocese of Broken Bay had used Corpus Christi Church in St Ives as its cathedral. In 2008, the decision was made to move the Bishop's seat to Our Lady of the Rosary, a more central location within the diocese with better access to public transport connections. On 10 February 2008 Our Lady of the Rosary was inaugurated as the cathedral of the Diocese of Broken Bay.

References

External links
Hornsby Cathedral Parish website

See also

Roman Catholic cathedrals in New South Wales
Roman Catholic churches in Sydney
20th-century Roman Catholic church buildings in Australia